Nerudia is a monotypic genus of South American cellar spiders containing the single species, Nerudia atacama. It was first described by B. A. Huber in 2000, and named in honour of Chilean poet Pablo Neruda. It is only found in Argentina and Chile.

See also
 List of Pholcidae species
List of organisms named after famous people (born 1900–1949)

References

External links
 

Monotypic Araneomorphae genera
Pholcidae
Spiders of South America